This is a list of populated places in North Sumatra, with their type.

-

References

https://geographic.org/geographic_names/name.php?uni=10319785&fid=2672&c=indonesia